Polk County Public Schools is a school district headquartered in Bartow, Florida, United States. The district serves Polk County.

History

Civil rights era
Before 1965, Polk County maintained two separate school systems, one for white students, and a separate system for non-white students. In 1963, a group of parents of Black students attempted to have their children admitted to the all-white schools. When their applications were denied by the school board, they filed suit in federal district court. In early 1965, a federal judge ordered the schools to formulate a plan to integrate both students and teachers, and provide equal facilities and programs for all students regardless of race. For 1965, the district instituted a sham desegregation plan. In 1969, after additional adverse federal rulings, the district adopted another plan which also proved to be ineffective at integrating the schools. The schools became substantially integrated by 1994.

2020s
By October 13, 2021, 17 employees died in the COVID-19 pandemic in Florida, with 15 of them having started work for the fall semester.

Controversies

Intelligent design controversy
In November 2007, four Polk County School Board members interviewed by The Ledger daily newspaper said they would support a resolution advising the Florida Board of Education to revise proposed science standards to include alternative theories to evolution.

Expulsion of student for science experiment
In 2013 the district expelled a 16-year-old girl after her experiment mixing household materials resulted in a small explosion.  The student was arrested and charged with possession/discharge of a weapon on school property and discharging a destructive device. Scientists posted tweets condemning the district's response. Tiffany Madison of the Washington Times argued that the district's punishment reflected American schools becoming "mindless, bureaucratic prisons".

School uniforms
The district requires all students in Kindergarten through 8th grade to wear school uniforms.

Number of schools
Polk County Public Schools is one of the largest school districts in the nation, encompassing more than 150 schools and serving more than 100,000 students through both traditional K-12 schools and a variety of other programs.

High schools

 Auburndale Senior High School (mascot: Bloodhounds)
 Bartow Senior High School (Yellow Jackets)
 Chain of Lakes Collegiate High School (Eagles)
 Davenport Senior High School (Broncos)
 Fort Meade Middle-Senior High School (Miners)
 Frostproof Middle-Senior High School (Bulldogs)
 George Jenkins Senior High School (Eagles)
 Haines City Senior High School (Hornets)
 Jewett High School Former black high school in Winter Haven prior to integration
 Harrison School for the Arts
 Kathleen Senior High School (Red Devils)
 Lake Gibson Senior High School (Braves)
 Lake Region Senior High School (Thunder)
 Lakeland Senior High School (Dreadnaughts)
 Lake Wales High School (Highlanders)
 McKeel Academy of Technology (Wildcats)
 Mulberry High School (Panthers)
 Polk State College Lakeland Collegiate High School (Eagles)
 Ridge Community High School (Bolts)
 Rochelle School of the Arts Black high school prior to integration; now a K-8 magnet.
 Roosevelt High School, a black high school in Lake Wales prior to integration. 
 Tenoroc Senior High School (Titans)
 Union Academy Former black high school before integration; now a middle school
 Winter Haven Senior High School (Blue Devils)

Middle schools

Bartow Middle
Citrus Ridge: A Civics Academy
Crystal Lake Middle
Daniel Jenkins Academy
Davenport School of the Arts (magnet)
Denison Middle
Doris A Sanders Learning Center
Dundee Ridge Middle
Fort Meade Middle-Senior
Frostproof Middle-Senior
Gause Academy of Leadership
Jean O'Dell Learning Center
Jere L. Stambaugh Middle
Jewett Middle Academy
Jewett School of the Arts
Karen M. Siegel Academy
Kathleen Middle
Lake Alfred Polytech Academy
Lake Gibson Middle
Lake Marion Creek Middle
Lakeland Highlands Middle
Language & Literacy Academy
Lawton Chiles Middle Academy
McLaughlin Middle School and Fine Arts Academy
Mulberry Middle
New Beginnings High
REAL Academy
Rochelle School of the Arts
Roosevelt Academy
Rosabelle W. Blake Academy
Shelley S. Boone Middle
Sleepy Hill Middle
Southwest Middle
Union Academy
Westwood Middle

Elementary schools

Alta Vista Elementary
Alturas Elementary
Auburndale Central Elementary
Bartow Elementary Academy
Ben Hill Griffin Jr Elementary
Bethune Academy
Carlton Palmore Elementary
Chain of Lakes Elementary
Citrus Ridge: A Civics Academy
Clarence Boswell Elementary
Cleveland Court Elementary
Combee Academy (CODE Academy - magnet)
Crystal Lake Elementary
Davenport Elementary
Davenport School of the Arts (magnet)
Dixieland Elementary
Doris A Sanders Learning Center
Dr. N.E. Roberts Elementary
Dundee Elementary
Eagle Lake Elementary
Eastside Elementary
Edgar Padgett Elementary
Elbert Elementary
Floral Avenue Elementary
Frank E. Brigham Academy
Fred G. Garner Elementary
Frostproof Elementary
Garden Grove Elementary
Gause Academy of Leadership
Gibbons Street PreK Center
Griffin Elementary School
Highland City Elementary
Highlands Grove Elementary
Horizons Elementary
Inwood Elementary
James E. Stephens Elementary
James W. Sikes Elementary
Jean O'Dell Learning Center
Jesse Keen Elementary
Jewett School of the Arts
Karen M. Siegel Academy
Kathleen Elementary
Kingsford Elementary
Lake Alfred Elementary
Lake Shipp Elementary
Laurel Elementary
Lena Vista Elementary
Lewis Anna Woodbury Elementary
Lewis Elementary (PK-3)
Lincoln Avenue Academy (magnet)
Loughman Oaks Elementary
Medulla Elementary
North Lakeland Elementary
Oscar J. Pope Elementary
Palmetto Elementary
Philip O'Brien Elementary
Pinewood Elementary
Polk City Elementary School
Purcell Elementary
R. Bruce Wagner Elementary
R. Clem Churchwell Elementary
REAL Academy
Rochelle School of the Arts
Rosabelle W. Blake Academy
Sandhill Elementary School
Scott Lake Elementary School
Sleepy Hill Elementary
Snively Elementary
Socrum Elementary
Southwest Elementary
Spessard L. Holland Elementary School
Spook Hill Elementary
Valleyview Elementary
Wahneta Elementary
Walter Caldwell Elementary
Wendell Watson Elementary
Winston Academy of Engineering (magnet)

Charter Schools in District

Achievement Academy - Bartow
Achievement Academy - Lakeland
Achievement Academy - Winter Haven
Berkley Accelerated Middle
Berkley Elementary
Chain of Lakes Collegiate High School
Compass Middle Charter
Cypress Junction Montessori
Dale R. Fair Babson Park Elementary
Discovery Academy of Lake Alfred
Discovery High School
Edward W. Bok Academy
Edward W. Bok Academy, North
Hartridge Academy
Hillcrest Elementary
Janie Howard Wilson Elementary
Lake Wales Senior High
Lakeland Montessori Middle
Lakeland Montessori Schoolhouse
Language & Literacy Academy
Magnolia Montessori Academy
McKeel Academy of Technology
McKeel Central Academy
Mi Escuela Montessori
Navigator Academy of Leadership
New Beginnings High
Polk Avenue Elementary
Polk Pre-Collegiate Academy
Polk State College Collegiate High
Polk State Lakeland Gateway
Ridgeview Global Studies Academy
South McKeel Academy
Victory Ridge Academy

References

External links

 

Public Schools
School districts in Florida